Hope is the third studio album by Welsh post-hardcore band The Blackout.

Production
The album was first announced in mid-2010 that the band had begun work on the album. The album was recorded at the end of 2010 and was funded by donations by fans on the website PledgeMusic. Recording was held at AIR Studios, Angelic Studios, and The Yard, with producer Jason Perry. Adam Noble acted as engineer, with additional engineering from Perry; the pair  did Pro Tools editing. An assistant engineer aided them at each studio: Fiona Cruickshank (AIR), Tom Fuller (Angelic), and Mark Allaway (The Yard). Due to drummer Gareth Lawrence does not drum on the album, his place was taken by drummers Phillip Jenkins of Kids in Glass Houses and Tom Winch of Hexes. John Mitchell mixed all of the recordings, before they were mastered by Tom Baker at Precision Mastering.

Release
On 12 January 2011, vocalist Gavin Butler said their new album would be titled Hope. "Ambition Is Critical" was released as a free download on 21 January from the group's website. Following the track being played on BBC Radio 1's Rock Show, a music video was released for the track on 25 January. Two days later, the album's artwork and track listing were revealed. The first single to be released from the album was Higher & Higher, which features Hyro Da Hero. The formerly titled "Whatever You Hear, Don't Scream" was released on 13 February 2011 on iTunes as a one track single. On 28 March 2011 it was released again this time with two b-sides, a Tek One remix and a Live recording from their Nottingham Show on the My Chemical Romance World Contamination Tour.

In March and April, the group went on a UK tour alongside the Swellers and Hyro da Hero. A music video was released for "Never by Your Side" on 10 May. Kerrang! magazine revealed that it would be released as the second single with an expected release date of 30 May. On 18 July, a music video was released for "The Storm". The group appeared at the Reading and Leeds Festivals in August, before headlining the main stage at Merthyr Rock festival in September. A music video was released for "You're Not Alone" on 23 September. In October and November, the group went on a UK headlining tour with support from We Are the Ocean and Canterbury.

Track listing
All music and lyrics by the Blackout and Jason Perry, except for "Higher & Higher" by the Blackout, Perry, and Hyron Fenton.

Personnel
Personnel per booklet.

The Blackout
 Sean Smith – vocals
 Gavin Butler – vocals
 James Davies – guitar
 Matthew Davies – guitar
 Rhys Lewis – bass

Additional musicians
 Philip Jenkins – drums
 Thomas Winch – drums
 Taylor Jane Smith – gang vocals
 Frances Sales – gang vocals
 Emma Courridge – gang vocals
 Hayley Connelly – gang vocals
 Nick Harnett – gang vocals
 Sean Goulding – gang vocals
 Hyro da Hero – vocals (track 3)

Production and design
 Jason Perry – producer, additional engineering, Pro Tools editing
 John Mitchell – mixing
 Adam Noble – engineer, Pro Tools editing
 Fiona Cruickshank – assistant engineer
 Tom Fuller – assistant engineer
 Mark Allaway – assistant engineer
 Tom Baker – mastering
 Steven Fessey – artwork
 Ismay Ozga-Lawn – additional photography

Charts

References

External links

Hope at YouTube (streamed copy where licensed)

2011 albums
The Blackout (band) albums
Cooking Vinyl albums